German Brass is a professional brass ensemble

The ensemble was founded in 1974 as a Brass Quintet. Until 1983 the ensemble performed under the names Deutsches Blechbläserquintett, German Brass Quintett and Quintette à Cuivres Allemand.

In 1985, to record the CD "Bach 300" (Johann Sebastian Bach was born in 1685) the group was extended by Enrique Crespo to ten performers. At that time the ensemble was renamed German Brass.
In 2011, differences arose over the trademark rights for German Brass between Crespo and the other members of the ensemble. Since then, they have performed without trombonist Crespo.

More than twenty CDs and two DVDs have been recorded to date. German Brass musicians are members of major German symphony orchestras and/or are professors at university schools of music.

The current members are:

Trumpets:
Matthias Höfs
Uwe Köller
Werner Heckmann
Christoph Baerwind
Trombones:
Alexander Erbrich-Crawford
Uwe Füssel
Fritz Winter
French horns
Wolfgang Gaag
Klaus Wallendorf
Tuba:
Stefan Ambrosius
Percussion
Herbert Wachter

References

External links 
 

Brass quintets
Chamber music groups
German musical groups
Musical groups established in 1974